Ceiriog is a Welsh name. It may refer to:

River Ceiriog
The Ceiriog Valley
Ceiriog, the bardic name of John Ceiriog Hughes (1832–87)
Ceiriog Rural District, a former rural district in Denbighshire (historic), Wales from 1935 to 1974